Nigamnagar is a village of Dinhata subdivision, Cooch Behar District, in the state of West Bengal, India.Nigamnagar is popular for the temple of thakur Nigamananda Paramahansha.It is situated beside baniadaha river.

Geography

Nigamnagar has an average elevation of 39 metres (128 feet).

Demographics
 India census, Nigamnagar had a population of 8,303. Males constitute 51% of the population and females 49%. Nigamnagar has an average literacy rate of 80%, higher than the national average of 59.5%: male literacy is 84% and, female literacy is 75%. In Nigamnagar, 9% of the population is under 6 years of age.

Climate

Nigamnagar has three distinct seasons: summer, winter and monsoon. In summer the temperature reaches 35 degree Celsius. Winters are generally chilled and cool when temperature goes down to 5 to 6 degree Celsius. During the monsoons (between June and September), the city is lashed by moderate to heavy rains. The city has several faults or uplands nearby and is the reason for frequent earthquakes. The climate is suitable for growing rice and the surrounding regions have many tea gardens.

References

Villages in Cooch Behar district